The Battle of Cremona was fought in 200 BC between the Roman Republic and Cisalpine Gaul. The Roman force was victorious.

Towards the end of the Second Punic War, tribes in Cisalpine Gaul rebelled against the Republic, sacking the city of Placentia. The governor of the area, Lucius Furius Purpureo, following senatorial orders, disbanded all but 5,000 men in his army and took up defences at Ariminum. Upon the arrival of the consular army of Gaius Aurelius Cotta to their aid, the 5,000 soldiers were moved to Etruria. On the following day, the Gallic army of 35,000, led by a Carthaginian general, Hamilcar, began the battle by attempting to overwhelm the right flank of the Roman army with speed and numbers. Having failed in this task, they then failed to flank both wings of the Romans, for Purpureo had lengthened his flanks and called up legionary support. Now counter-attacking on all sides, Purpureo's men suppressed the Gallic flanks and broke their centre ranks, soon routing the enemy completely and killing or capturing over 35,000, including the commander, Hamilcar.

See also
 Roman Republican governors of Gaul

Bibliography
Livy; Henry Bettenson (Editor) (1976). Ab vrbe condita Book XXXI. London: The Penguin Group

Battles involving the Roman Republic
Battles involving the Gauls
Battles in Lombardy
2nd century BC in the Roman Republic
200s BC conflicts
200 BC